Hui River (also pronounced as Kuai River), traditionally known as Huan River or Baohui River, was a major tributary of Huai River in northern China. Currently, it flows into the Huai-Hong New Canal
, a constructed flood control waterway connecting Huaiyuan and Hongze Lake. The starting point of Hui River is the ancient Honggou Canal (鸿沟), which has a great historical significance because it was the border between territories controlled by Liu Bang and Xiang Yu during the Chu-Han Contention (206 - 202 BCE). The river is mainly recharged by rainwater and groundwater. The river is heavily polluted by wastewater from nearby towns.

References 

Huai River
Rivers of Henan
Rivers of Anhui